E. edulis may refer to:
 Echeveria edulis, a synonym of Dudleya edulis, the fingertips, a succulent plant species
 Euterpe edulis, the juçara, açaí-do-sul or palmiteiro, a palm tree species

See also
 Edulis (disambiguation)